Johann Simon Haspinger (28 October 1776 – 12 January 1858) was a Capuchin priest and a leader of the Tyrolean Rebellion against the French and Bavarian occupation forces during the Napoleonic War of the Fifth Coalition.

External links
 Johann Simon Haspinger – Catholic Encyclopedia article

References

1776 births
1858 deaths
People from Gsies
19th-century Austrian Roman Catholic priests